It Was a Dark and Stormy Night is a dark comedic play written by Tim Kelly about a number of guests who become trapped in a New England Inn. The play won the Robert J. Pickering Award for Play writing Excellence, and was first published in 1988. The title is a nod to the famous phrase written by Edward Bulwer-Lytton, "It was a dark and stormy night."

Overview
The play is set during a storm in Massachusetts. Guests continue to happen upon the infamously isolated Ye Olde Wayside Inn, bringing them upon the acquaintances of Hepzibah, Arabella, and Ebenezer Saltmarsh, their Uncle Silas, and the hired girl, Olive. The guests of the Inn continue to follow the mystery of Olive, the peculiar nurse, Ebenezer and his obsession with "Effie", the crazy Saltmarsh sisters, and their late ancestor, "The General".

Characters
HEPZIBAH SALTMARSH, eccentric sister of Arabella and cousin to Ebenezer, old
ARABELLA, also eccentric, less old
OLIVE, the hired girl, outlandish
EBENEZER, insane Saltmarsh cousin
JANE ADAMS, job applicant and thief
MARY SHAW, job applicant
SNELL, state trooper
ED PERKINS, cab driver and college student
DOROTHY BLAKE, Mary's younger sister, friend of Ed
BELLE MALIBU, vital witness
DAWSON, detective, Belle's police escort
UNCLE SILAS, oldest maniac in Massachusetts
SMILING SAM, the beauty man
EUPHEMIA, aspiring nurse

References

1988 plays